Matjaž Klopčič (4 December 1934 – 15 December 2007) was a Slovenian film director and screenwriter. He directed 28 films between 1959 and 2005. His film Heritage was screened in the Un Certain Regard section at the 1985 Cannes Film Festival. Many of his films starred Polde Bibič.

He was the son of the poet Mile Klopčič, and the nephew of the Communist activist and historian France Klopčič.

Selected filmography
 On the Sunny Side of the Street (1959), (short)
 The Widowhood of Karolina Zasler (1976)
 Heritage (1984)
 My Dad, the Socialist Kulak (1987)

References

External links

1934 births
2007 deaths
Film people from Ljubljana
Slovenian film directors
Slovenian screenwriters
Male screenwriters
Golden Arena for Best Director winners
Yugoslav film directors
20th-century screenwriters